Hafliði Hallgrímsson (born 1941 in Akureyri) is an Icelandic composer, currently living in Bath, England. Hafliði was the principal cellist of the Scottish Chamber Orchestra, but left that position in 1983 to pursue a full-time career as a composer. In 2008, he became composer-in-residence of the Iceland Symphony Orchestra (through 2010).

In 1970, Hafliði played the (uncredited) cello solo on “Atom Heart Mother” by Pink Floyd.

Selected compositions 
 Verse I for flute and cello (1975)
 Poemi for violin and string orchestra (1983)
 Eight Pieces for wind quintet (1991)
 Intarsia for wind quintet (1992 revision of Eight Pieces for wind quintet)
 Rima for soprano and string orchestra (1994)
 Herma for cello and string orchestra (1995)
 Crucifixion for orchestra (1997)
 Mini-stories, music theatre work (1997)
 Passía for mezzo-soprano, tenor, choir and chamber orchestra (2001) 
 Die Wält der Zwischenfälle, chamber opera (2003)
 Cello Concerto (2003)
 Dagbókarbrot (Notes from a Diary) for viola and piano, Op. 33 (2005); dedicated to the memory of Anne Frank
 Narratives from the Deep North for symphony orchestra, Op. 41 (2009)

Selected recordings 
 Herma; Ombra; Rima - Smekkleysa SMK 38
 Daydreams in Numbers; Jacob’s Ladder; Strönd; Tristia; Verse I - Merlin MRFD 88101
 Four Movements for String Quartet; Offerto; Solitaire; String Quartet No 1 - Eye of the Storm EOS 5004
 Passía. Ondine ODE 1027-2 (2003)
 Cello concerto; Herma. Ondine 1133-2 (2009)

References

External links 
 Haflidi Hallgrímsson's homepage at Chester Music
 
 performed by the Winchester College Chapel Choir

Icelandic composers
Icelandic male musicians
Icelandic classical cellists
Icelandic expatriates in Scotland
1941 births
Living people